George Perley Phenix (1864–1930), was an American educator and university president. He served as forth president of Hampton Normal and Agricultural Institute (now Hampton University), a historically Black university. He was the namesake of George P. Phenix High School, a segregated public secondary school for African-Americans affiliated with Hampton Institute.

Biography 
George Perley Phenix was born on September 1864 in Portland, Maine. He attended Colby College, where he received a D.S. degree (1883) and was a member of Phi Beta Kappa. 

After graduation Phenix worked as an instructor of the natural sciences at the State Normal School in New Britain, Connecticut before he became a principal of the State Normal School at Willimantic. He was married to Maria Elizabeth Stevens, and together they had son George Spencer Phenix.

In 1904, Phenix moved to Hampton, Virginia to teach at Hampton Normal and Agricultural Institute (now Hampton University). He initially worked as a vice principal and director of the summer school at Hampton. In 1930, he was selected as the president of Hampton Normal and Agricultural Institute (now Hampton University), a role he served for only 6 months before drowning. He was the first person to be bestowed the title of "president", prior the title used was principals. During Phenix's time as president, the name of the school was changed from Hampton Normal and Agricultural Institute to the Hampton Institute, and the school established the School of Nursing.

He died on October 4, 1930 of a heart attack, while swimming at Buckroe Beach. Phenix is buried in the Hampton University Cemetery.

References 

1864 births
1930 deaths
Educators from Portland, Maine
Colby College alumni
Presidents of Hampton University
People from Hampton, Virginia
20th-century American educators